CAPC may refer to:
 CAPC musée d'art contemporain de Bordeaux, a contemporary art museum in Bordeaux, France
 Campaign Against Political Correctness, a non-partisan organisation in the United Kingdom 
 Capitaine de corvette, or naval Lieutenant-commander
 Capital & Counties Properties (Capco), a United Kingdom-based property investment and development company
 Center for American Politics and Citizenship, a non-partisan Government and Politics research center at the University of Maryland, College Park
 Companion Animal Parasite Council, a non-profit organization